François van der Merwe is a South African professional rugby union player. He plays at lock for Lyon Olympique in the Top 14. He is older brother of Flip van der Merwe

References

External links
Ligue Nationale De Rugby Profile
European Professional Club Rugby Profile
Racing Metro Profile

Racing 92 players
People from Bloemfontein
1983 births
Living people